The Polish film industry produced over one hundred feature films in 2017. This article fully lists all non-pornographic films, including short films, that had a release date in that year and which were at least partly made by Polish. It does not include films first released in previous years that had release dates in 2017. Also included is an overview of the major events in Polish film, including film festivals and awards ceremonies, as well as lists of those films that have been particularly well received, both critically and financially.

Major Releases

References

Polish
Films
2017